Vettius is a genus of skippers in the family Hesperiidae.

Species
Recognised species in the genus Vettius include:
 Vettius phyllus Cramer, 1777
 Vettius pica
 Vettius triangularis (Hübner, [1831])

Former species
Vettius arva Evans, 1955 - transferred to Psoralis arva (Evans, 1955)
Vettius lafrenaye (Latreille, [1824]) - synonymized with Dubiella dubius (Stoll, 1781)
Vettius fuldai Bell, 1930 - transferred to Phlebodes fuldai (Bell, 1930)
Vettius yalta Evans,  1955 - synonymized with Phlebodes fuldai (Bell, 1930)

References

Natural History Museum Lepidoptera genus database

Hesperiinae
Hesperiidae genera